Thioploca chileae is a marine thioploca from the benthos of the Chilean continental shelf. It is a colonial, multicellular, gliding trichomes of similar diameter enclosed by a shared sheath. It possesses cellular sulfur inclusions located in a thin peripheral cytoplasm surrounding a large, central vacuole. It is a motile organism through gliding. The trichome diameters of Thioploca chileae range from 12 to 20 μm.

References

Further reading
GALLARDO, VÍCTOR ARIEL, and CAROLA ESPINOZA. "BACTERIAS MARINAS GIGANTES."
Schulz, Heide N., et al. "Population study of the filamentous sulfur bacteria Thioploca spp. off the Bay of Concepción, Chile." Marine ecology. Progress series 200 (2000): 117–126.
Schulz, Heide N., et al. "Community structure of filamentous, sheath-building sulfur bacteria, Thioploca spp., off the coast of Chile." Applied and Environmental Microbiology 62.6 (1996): 1855–1862.

External links 
LPSN

WORMS

Thiotrichales